Reda Mohamed Amine Benchaa (born 12 March 2002) is a professional footballer who plays as a centre-back for Dijon. Born in France, he is a youth international for Algeria.

Career
Benchaa is a youth product of the academy of Red Star, and moved to Dijon's youth sides in May 2017. He debuted with their reserves in 2021. He made his professional and Ligue 2 debut with Dijon in a 2–1 loss to Nîmes on 8 January 2022. On 16 March 2022, Benchaa signed his first professional contract with Dijon for 3 years.

International career
Born in France, Benchaa is of Algerian descent. He captained the Algeria U23s at the 2022 Maurice Revello Tournament.

References

External links
 

2002 births
Living people
People from Le Blanc-Mesnil
Algerian footballers
Algeria youth international footballers
French footballers
French sportspeople of Algerian descent
Association football defenders
Ligue 2 players
Championnat National 3 players
Dijon FCO players